La Prensa ("The Press") is a frequently used name for newspapers in the Spanish-speaking world. It may refer to:

Argentina
 La Prensa (Buenos Aires)
 , a current publication of Caleta Olivia, Santa Cruz

Bolivia
 La Prensa (La Paz), a newspaper in Bolivia

Canada
 , a current publication in Alberta

Chile
  (La Prensa), the former name of La Estrella de Tocopilla in Tocopilla
 La Prensa (Curicó)

Cuba
 Prensa Latina, the official state news agency of Cuba

Ecuador
 La Prensa (Riobamba), a newspaper in Ecuador

El Salvador
 La Prensa Gráfica, commonly known as La Prensa

Honduras
 La Prensa (Honduras), a newspaper in San Pedro Sula

Mexico
 La Prensa (Mexico City)

Nicaragua
 La Prensa (Managua)

Panama
 La Prensa (Panama City)

Peru
 , a former newspaper in Peru

Spain
  (1941-1979)
  (1921-1936)
  (1910-1939)

United States
 La Prensa (California), founded 1999, serving Riverside and San Bernardino counties, owned by Southern California News Group
 , a Central Florida publication owned by ImpreMedia
 La Prensa (Michigan), a newspaper of Detroit, Michigan
 La Prensa (San Antonio), a former newspaper in Texas
 La Prensa de San Antonio, a Spanish/English newspaper in San Antonio, Texas
 El Diario La Prensa, a New York City publication founded as La Prensa

Venezuela
 La Prensa (Barinas), a regional newspaper of Venezuela
 La Prensa (Barquisimeto), a regional newspaper of Venezuela
 La Prensa de Monagas, a regional newspaper of Venezuela
 La Prensa (Puerto La Cruz), a regional newspaper of Venezuela

See also 
 
 Prensa Libre (disambiguation)
 La Presa (disambiguation)